The 179th (2/4th London) Brigade was a formation of the British Army during the First World War. It was assigned to the 60th (2/2nd London) Division and served in the Middle East. Raised by Colonel, later Brigadier-General, Ned Baird.

Formation
All battalions of the London Regiment as follows:
2/13th (County of London) Battalion (Kensington)
2/14th (County of London) Battalion (London Scottish)
2/15th (County of London) Battalion (Prince of Wales's Own Civil Service Rifles)
2/16th (County of London) Battalion (Queen's Westminster Rifles)
179th Machine Gun Company
179th Trench Mortar Battery
In June 1918 three battalions (2/14th, 2/15th and 2/16th) were replaced by
2nd Battalion, 19th Punjabis
2nd Battalion, 127th Baluchis
3rd Battalion, 151st Punjabi Rifles

Commanders

References

Infantry brigades of the British Army in World War I
Military units and formations in London